Bhawani Prasad Mishra (29 March 1913 – 20 February 1985) was a Hindi poet and author. He was honoured with Sahitya Akademi Award in 1972 for his book Buni Hui Rassi.

Born on 29 March 1913 in the village Tigaria of Hoshangabad district in erstwhile Central Province of British India. He lived for a long time in Delhi but died on 20 February 1985 amidst his family members at Narsinghpur town of Madhya Pradesh where he had gone to attend a marriage function.

Works
Some of the notable works of Mishra are-
Ye kohare mere haainn
Trikaal sandhyaaah,
Tus ki aag,
Kuchh neeti kuchh rajneethtti,
Idaṃ na mam,
Geetfarosh,
Buni hui rassi.
Kathputli kavita.
Satpuda ke ghane jungle (poem)
Pahila pain (poem)
Ghar ki yaad (poem)
Man Ek Maili Kameez Hai
Trikal Sandhya

Criticism
A Gandhian in thought and deeds, Mishra was deeply disturbed by the so-called effects of colonizaton in the country. He used to call it a kind of poisoned sweet in the garb of present English education system of India.

External links
 Poems by Bhavani Prasad Mishra
 Photo and books of Bhawani Prasad Mishra
 Introduction of Bhawani Prasad Mishra

References

Hindi-language poets
1913 births
1985 deaths
20th-century Indian poets
Indian male poets
Poets from Madhya Pradesh
20th-century Indian male writers
Recipients of the Sahitya Akademi Award in Hindi